Róbert Nagy may refer to:

 Róbert Nagy (cyclist) (born 1972), Slovak cyclist
 Róbert Nagy (footballer) (born 1987), Hungarian football (soccer) player
 Róbert Nagy (speedway rider) (born 1967), Hungarian motorcycle speedway rider
 Robert Nagy (tenor) (1929–2008), opera singer with the Metropolitan Opera
 Róbert Nagy (weightlifter) (born 1940), Hungarian Olympic weightlifter
 Robert Nagy (windsurfer) (born 1963), French windsurfer